Patriensa is a town in the Asante Akim central municipality  of the  Ashanti region of south-central Ghana. There are about 7,000 residents, two-quarters of which make their living from farming. There are 25 other villages in the district.

Villages in Ghana